The men's long jump at the 2017 Asian Athletics Championships was held on 8 and 9 July.

Medalists

Results

Qualification

Final

References

Long
Long jump at the Asian Athletics Championships